Wapel is a river of Lower Saxony, Germany. It flows into the Jade southeast of Varel.

See also
List of rivers of Lower Saxony

References

Rivers of Lower Saxony
1Wapel
Rivers of Germany